Adama Cissé (born 21 March 1967) is a Senegalese footballer. He played in six matches for the Senegal national football team from 1992 to 1995. He was also named in Senegal's squad for the 1990 African Cup of Nations tournament.

References

External links
 

1967 births
Living people
Senegalese footballers
Senegal international footballers
1990 African Cup of Nations players
Place of birth missing (living people)
Association football midfielders
ASC Jaraaf players